The men's Greco-Roman 59 kilograms wrestling competition at the 2014 Asian Games in Incheon was held on 30 September 2014 at the Dowon Gymnasium.

Schedule
All times are Korea Standard Time (UTC+09:00)

Results 
Legend
C — Won by 3 cautions given to the opponent
F — Won by fall

Main bracket

Repechage

Final standing

References

Wrestling Database

External links
Official website

Wrestling at the 2014 Asian Games